Bennington Street is one of the main thoroughfares in the neighborhood of East Boston in Boston, Massachusetts. The street runs almost the length of the residential section of the community, as distinguished from Logan International Airport, which makes up almost half of the community's landmass.

Bennington Street, one of several local streets named after battles of the American Revolution, namely the Battle of Bennington.  The street begins at the neighborhood's Central Square as a narrow two-way road crowded with shops and houses. After about half a mile, the street crosses Chelsea Street, another of the community's busiest street, at the intersection of Day Square, one of East Boston's main retail centers.

From there, Bennington Street widens into a tree-lined road with two lanes of traffic in each direction separated by an island. The road then goes through the center of the Orient Heights section of the neighborhood and curves left past the Belle Isle Marsh Reservation on the right and Suffolk Downs on the left, entering the city of Revere and ending in Beachmont at Station Square at the intersection of Winthrop Street and State Road.

External links

Streets in Boston
East Boston